Grüneisen or Gruneisen is a surname, meaning "green iron" in the German language. Notable people named Grüneisen include:
Eduard Grüneisen (1877–1949), German physicist and the co-eponym of Mie–Grüneisen equation of state
Fritz Grüneisen, Swiss footballer
Sam Gruneisen (1941–2012), American football player and coach

Jewish surnames
German-language surnames
Yiddish-language surnames
Surnames from ornamental names